April Sanders is a former educator, physician and former political figure in British Columbia, Canada. She represented Okanagan-Vernon in the Legislative Assembly of British Columbia from 1996 to 2001 as a Liberal.

Sanders taught elementary, secondary and post-secondary school students before studying medicine. She specialized in family practice and sports medicine. Sanders did not run for reelection in 2001.

References 

Year of birth missing (living people)
Living people
British Columbia Liberal Party MLAs
20th-century Canadian physicians
Physicians from British Columbia
20th-century Canadian politicians
21st-century Canadian politicians
20th-century Canadian women politicians
21st-century Canadian women politicians
Canadian educators
Canadian women physicians
Women MLAs in British Columbia
20th-century women physicians